The 2020–21 PGA Tour of Australasia, titled as the 2020–21 ISPS Handa PGA Tour of Australasia for sponsorship reasons, was a series of men's professional golf events played mainly in Australia. The main tournaments on the PGA Tour of Australasia are played in the southern summer, so they are split between the first and last months of the year.

The season was impacted by the COVID-19 pandemic with several tournaments being postponed or cancelled. In response, the tour announced that the season would be extended through to March 2021, with subsequent seasons being seasonal rather than calendar based.

Schedule
The following table lists official events during the 2020–21 season.

Unofficial events
The following events were sanctioned by the PGA Tour of Australasia, but did not carry official money, nor were wins official.

Order of Merit
The Order of Merit was based on prize money won during the season, calculated in Australian dollars. The leading player on the tour (not otherwise exempt) earned status to play on the 2022 European Tour.

Awards

Notes

References

External links

PGA Tour of Australasia
Australasia
Australasia
PGA Tour of Australasia
PGA Tour of Australasia
PGA Tour of Australasia
PGA Tour of Australasia
PGA Tour of Australasia